Morten Silberg Schantz (born 19 October 1980) is a Danish jazz pianist.

Career 

Schantz was raised in Kalundborg, where he started playing classical piano at the age of 6 years but eventually had motivation problems in early adolescence. While getting a new and inspiring teacher, he got back motivation and was introduced to jazz. He was quickly inspired by bands and musicians like Weather Report, Miles Davis, McCoy Tyner, Chick Corea, David Sanborn, and Herbie Hancock.

Schantz formed his first trio as band leader in 1997, and they got the opportunity to play gigs at local clubs and released their first demo album Cantaloupe Island, the year after. In 1998 he formed The Marten Schantz Segment including his earlier so inspiring teacher, Mikkel Uhrenholdt (saxophone) and Jesper Thomsen (drums).

In 2001 he joined the band Mikhalized where he contributed the debut album Jazz Muffin (2003) In 2005 he started the highly acclaimed band JazzKamikaze with musicians from Denmark, Sweden and Norway, and that same year they received the award Young Nordic Jazz Comets. They have performed at jazz festivals around the world.

In July 2015 his band Godspeed debuted at the Copenhagen Jazz Festival venue Huset, Musikcaféen in Copenhagen, Denmark. The band is a trio with Marius Neset and Anton Eger. The album Morten Schantz Godspeed with Marius Neset on sax and Anton Eger on drums was released by Edition Records in January 2017. In All About Jazz, Roger Farbey wrote, "Godspeed unceasingly rewards repeated plays and easily qualifies as one of the most exciting and engaging recordings for a long time. Schantz has surely now found his true métier."

Awards and honors 
2005: Young Nordic Jazz Comets, within the band JazzKamikaze

Discography

As leader 
2014: Unicorn (Calibrated Music)
2017: Godspeed (Edition)
2022: Passenger (April Records)

With Schantz Segment
2006: Return From Exile

Collaborations 
With Mikhalized
2003: Jazz Muffin

With JazzKamikaze
2005: Mission I (Stunt)
2007: Travelling at the Speed of Sound (Stunt)
2008: Emerging Pilots  (SevenSeas)
2009: The Revolution's in Your Hands  (SevenSeas)
2010: Supersonic Revolutions (SevenSeas)
2012: The Return of JazzKamikaze (Stunt)

References

External links

Morten Schantz Godspeed on YouTube
mikhalized.com

Avant-garde jazz musicians
Danish jazz pianists
Danish jazz composers
1980 births
Living people
People from Aarhus
21st-century pianists
JazzKamikaze members
Edition Records artists
Rune Grammofon artists